Tillys (originally known as World of Jeans and Tops and Tilly's) is an American retail clothing company that sells an assortment of branded apparel, accessories, shoes, and more. Tillys is headquartered and operated from Irvine, California.

History

Hezy Shaked, a former Israel Navy officer, and his wife, Tilly Levine, opened “World of Jeans and Tops” in Los Alamitos, California in 1982. Shaked later renamed the store “Tilly’s” after his wife. The couple divorced in 1989, but Levine continued to work for the company as director of vendor relations. The company went public in May 2012, raising $124 million through its initial public offering of stock.

Stores
Tillys stores are located in both traditional outdoor shopping centers and in shopping malls. Due to their size, Tillys locations in malls usually take up two or three store spaces. As of 2021, Tillys operates 240 stores in 33 states.

Brands
Tillys primarily sells clothing, shoes, and accessories for various active lifestyles including lounging, surfing, skateboarding, and snowboarding along with sports such as motorcross. Among the brands sold are Adidas, Billabong, DC Shoes, Element, Fox, Famous Stars and Straps, Elwood, Hurley, Nike SB, O'Neill, Quiksilver, RVCA, Vans, and Volcom, as well as an extensive selection of Levi's. They also sell store brands such as Blue Crown, RSQ, Micros, and West of Melrose.

References

External links

Companies listed on the New York Stock Exchange
Eyewear retailers of the United States
American companies established in 1982
Retail companies established in 1982
Clothing retailers of the United States
Companies based in Irvine, California
1982 establishments in California